Pothyne polyplicata is a species of beetle in the family Cerambycidae. It was described by Hua and She in 1987.

References

polyplicata
Beetles described in 1987